Cryosophila nana is a species of flowering plant in the family Arecaceae. It is found only in Mexico. It is threatened by habitat loss.

References

nana
Endemic flora of Mexico
Flora of Northwestern Mexico
Flora of Southwestern Mexico
Near threatened biota of Mexico
Taxonomy articles created by Polbot